Philip Fisher may refer to:

 Philip Fisher (1596–1652), a.k.a. Thomas Copley, English religious leader
 Philip Arthur Fisher (1907–2004), American entrepreneur & author 
 Philip Edward Fisher (born 1979), British classical pianist
 Philip Fisher (author) (born 1941), author and academic in English literature at Harvard University
 Philip "Fish", Fisher (fl. c. 1980), American musician, member of band Fishbone
 Philip Fisher (died 1776), Bristol architect who designed Shire Hall, Monmouth